Harris Academy Wimbledon  is  coeducational secondary school  located in the Wimbledon in Greater London, England. It is part of the Harris Federation multi-academy trust. It opened to pupils in September 2018 in temporary accommodation. It had a pre-opening Ofsted inspection.

Description 
It opened to a single year group, Year 7 in September 2018, with 90% of students following the EBacc curriculum of English, Maths, Biology, Physics, Chemistry, a Humanities subject (History and Geography) and a language (Spanish and Latin).

Curriculum intent
Virtually all maintained schools and academies follow the National Curriculum, and are inspected by Ofsted on how well they succeed in delivering a 'broad and balanced curriculum'. Schools endeavour to get all students to achieve the English Baccalaureate(EBACC) qualification- this must include core subjects a modern or ancient foreign language, and either History or Geography. Schools have been strongly advised to offer a three year Key Stage 3. The Harris Academy Wimbledon has decided that there are grounds for teaching all of its pupils Spanish and Latin. Spanish is justified on the number of hispanophones worldwide.

Buildings

The school opened in a refurbished Victoria premises but is to move new premises designed by CPMG Architects in 2020. Though the site is compact, it offers sports opportunities in football, rugby, hockey, netball, cricket, and tennis. There are programmes including drama, dance, music, technology, art & design and photography that will benefit from specialist rooms.

References

External links
 

Secondary schools in the London Borough of Merton
Wimbledon
Educational institutions established in 2018
2018 establishments in England
Free schools in London